Colombia's Next Top Model, Cycle 3 is the third cycle of the Colombian reality show based on the popular American format America's Next Top Model in which a number of women compete for the title of Colombia's Next Top Model and an opportunity to start her career in the modeling industry. The premiere of the third season was January 10, 2017.

The winner of the competition was 20-year-old Alejandra Merlano from Armenia.

Contestants
(ages stated are at start of contest)

Episodes

Episode 1
First aired January 10, 2017

Immune: María Camila Giraldo

Episode 2
First aired January 11, 2017

Bottom two: Dana Ceballos & Sasha Palma
Eliminated: Dana Ceballos

Episode 3
First aired January 12, 2017

Immune: Valentina Caicedo

Episode 4
First aired January 13, 2017

Challenge winner: Alejandra Merlano
Best photo: María Camila Giraldo
Bottom two: Paula Zamudio & Catherine Peña
Eliminated: Catherine Peña

Episode 5
First aired January 16, 2017

Immune: Paula Zamudio

Episode 6
First aired January 17, 2017

Challenge winner: Karen Soto
Best photo: Valentina Lagarejo
Bottom two: Valentina Londoño & Valentina Ortiz
Eliminated: Valentina Londoño

Episode 7
First aired January 18, 2017

Immune: Sasha Palma

Episode 8
First aired January 19, 2017
 
Challenge winner: Paula Zamudio
Best photo: Alejandra Merlano
Bottom two: Sofia Cuello & Valentina Ortiz
Eliminated: Valentina Ortiz

Episode 9
First aired January 20, 2017

Immune: Alejandra Merlano

Episode 10
First aired January 26, 2017

Challenge winner: Alejandra Merlano
Best photo: Karen Soto
Bottom two: Laura Espada & Valentina Lagarejo
Eliminated: Valentina Lagarejo

Episode 11
First aired January 27, 2017

Immune: Alejandra Merlano

Episode 12
First aired January 30, 2017

Challenge winner: Alejandra Merlano
Best photo: María Camila Giraldo
Bottom two: Laura Espada & Valentina Caicedo
Eliminated: Laura Espada

Episode 13
First aired January 31, 2017

Immune: Karen Soto

Episode 14
First aired February 1, 2017

Challenge winner: Sofia Cuello
Best photo: María Camila Giraldo
Bottom two: Paula Zamudio & Valentina Caicedo
Eliminated: Valentina Caicedo

Episode 15
First aired February 2, 2017

Immune: Karen Soto

Episode 16
First aired February 3, 2017

Challenge winner: Sofia Cuello
Best photo: Sasha Palma
Bottom two: Paula Zamudio & Sofia Cuello
Eliminated: Paula Zamudio

Episode 17
First aired February 6, 2017

Episode 18
First aired February 7, 2017

Best photo: María Camila Giraldo
Bottom three: Karen Soto, Sasha Palma & Sofia Cuello
Eliminated: Sofia Cuello

Episode 19
First aired January 8, 2017

Immune/Best photo: Sasha Palma

Episode 20
First aired February 9, 2017
 
Bottom two: Karen Soto & María Camila Giraldo
Eliminated: Karen Soto

Episode 21
First aired February 10, 2017
 
Colombia's Next Top Model: Alejandra Merlano

Call-out order

  The contestant was put through collectively to the next round   
  The contestant was eliminated 
 The contestant was immune from elimination
 The contestant won the competition

Photo shoot guide
 Episode 2 photo shoots: Underwater embodying Houdini, promo shots
 Episode 3 photo shoot: Pillow fight in lingerie with male models
 Episode 4 photo shoot: Zombies in a cemetery
 Episode 5 photo shoot: Sexy fire fighters
 Episode 6 photo shoot: Posing in a bath of flowers and ice
 Episode 7 photo shoot: Colonial beauties
 Episode 8 photo shoot: Golden goddesses embodying Bachué
 Episode 9 photo shoot: Beauty shots with jewelry for Masglo
 Episode 10 photo shoot: Farm style posing with a piggy
 Episode 11 photo shoot: In the circus
 Episode 12 photo shoot: Covered in oil
 Episode 13 photo shoot: Seven deadly sins
 Episode 14 photo shoot: Dance genres
 Episode 15 photo shoot: Life-size dolls
 Episode 16 photo shoot: Natural smiling beauty shots
 Episode 17 photo shoot: Colorful powder while jumping from a trampoline
 Episode 18 photo shoot: Sightseeing selfies
 Episode 19 photo shoot: Warriors fighting against themselves
 Episode 20 photo shoots: Posing as art painting; CROMOS cover try
 Episode 21 photo shoots: Posing as Cleopatra

External links
 Official website
  Colombia's Next Top Model Facebook page

2017 Colombian television seasons
Colombia's Next Top Model